The Moorish Queen (Spanish: La reina mora) is a 1937 Spanish musical film directed by Eusebio Fernández Ardavín and starring María Arias, Raquel Rodrigo and Alejandrina Caro.

The film's sets were designed by Santiago Ontañón.

Plot
Coral and Esteban are the two young men who are in love. When they arrived at the party though, the love changes into a quarrel in which Coral must calm down his opponent and Esteban is assigned to solve the matter. As expected, the fight ends with Esteban shooting his opponent and is sent to jail. Coral, saddened that his friend is confined, visits Esteban's brother in a Sevillian house to whom he tells of Esteban's deprivation of liberty. Their friendship will give rise to presumptuous Don Juans to launch their conquest for freedom and tales of legends.

Cast
María Arias as Coral  
Raquel Rodrigo as Mercedes  
Alejandrina Caro as Doña Juana  
Pedro Terol as Esteban  
Antonio Gil Varela 'Varillas' as Don Nuez  
Valeriano Ruiz París as Miguel Ángel  
Erasmo Pascual as Cotufa
José Córdoba as Peleón  
Carmen Vázquez as ballerina
Capelillo as singer
Manolito Heras as The Boy of the Birds  
J. Aguilar as Pepe López  
Enrique Salvador as Señor Pepe  
Anita Ramallo as Laurita  
Srta. Albillana as Isabel

References

External links

1937 musical films
Spanish musical films
Films directed by Eusebio Fernández Ardavín
Spanish black-and-white films
Cifesa films
1930s Spanish-language films